Vengeful Heart is a thriller film directed by Vietnamese-American director Victor Vu. The film was released on February 14, 2014. Starring actress Nha Phuong, actor Thai Hoa, Quy Binh, Hoang Bach, Tu Vi, Kim Xuan, Nancy Nguyen and Van Tung.

The film was based on same title play written by Thai Hoa, which used to be a best selling play at Phu Nhuan Theater.

Plot 
The story starts as Son takes his newly wife Linh on a vacation after her heart transplant. After the transplant, Linh keeps encountering unexplainable incidents and dreaming about a strange house located in the countryside of Da Lat. 49 days later, she sleepwalks to the grave of Phuong at an isolated area, where she meets Tam who is Phuong's husband. Tam brings Linh back to his house while waiting for Son to pick Linh up after informing him, Linh comes to realize this is the house which she has kept dreaming about. Entering the house, she meets Phuong's mother - Ms. Le and Cu Hu (a friend of Phuong and Tam). Son comes to pick Linh up, in the midst of talking, it is revealed that the heart which had been transplanted for Linh is from Phuong - Ms. Le's daughter also Tam's wife. Ms. Le gets emotional, therefore she invites both of them to stay at their house to join her late daughter's 49-day ceremony.

Many weird and supernatural incidents begin to happen since they have decided to stay, Linh has more sleepwalking incidents, while Son keeps being haunted, as well as there seems to be a soul or ghost trying to warn Linh something, to the point Linh is unable to leave that house as her heart will stop beating once she does it. Finally, after being heavily haunted, Son can't take it anymore and confesses that he caused the accident that killed Phuong in the middle of the street, however, he was in a rush to the hospital. Son drove away after calling the police to inform the situation. The police named Sau Dung invites him to the police station for a couple of questions. Thinking everything is coming to an end, things are getting weirder as Son claims that when he drove away, Phuong was still alive and was not injured, she was just unconscious. However, the body found by the police was heavily crushed, unable to identify, later Tam confirmed it was Phuong then took her body back home for the funeral.

Cu Hu discovers that Linh's blood type to be O, therefore she couldn't be able to get transplant by Phuong whose blood type is AB. Later, Linh and Cu Hu find a funeral table with the picture of Hong - who is allegedly Tam's business partner. Right after knowing that Hong is missing, Cu Hu drives Linh to the flower farm where Tam is working a night shift. Linh has intuition so she insists Tam to drive her back to the abandoned house on Ma Ta Hill, which turns out Phuong is still alive and has been locked inside for months.

Phuong says Hong is Tam's mistress and they had much debt due to their failed business. Knowing Tam wouldn't divorce Phuong (Tam truly loves Phuong) and leave her deal with all the debts alone, Hong had secretly texted and told Phuong to go to the abandoned house on Ma Ta Hill in order to know the truth about her husband. Phuong was hiding outside and heard the full story, which little did she know that Tam hits Hong with a shovel later. Phuong terrifyingly ran away while Tam was chasing her. As she was about to get close to the outskirt of the wood, Phuong got hit by Son while carelessly crossing the road. Tam hid until Son drove away, Phuong was still alive and kept warning that she would report this to the police. Tam decided to switch Phuong and Hong's clothes and locked Phuong in the basement, then Tam carried barely conscious Hong to the road where Phuong got hit previously. Tam used Phuong's car to crush Hong until she was completely dead, then made a false statement about Phuong that she was in the accident in which her face was fully crushed. Actually, the heart Linh carries is from Hong. Cu Hu calls the police right away, however, he is hit by Tam, while Linh is chased by Tam in the woods. As she is about to reach the outskirt, Linh suddenly falls like Phuong did. Tam intends to kill Linh but the ghost of Hong shows up to save her. Being terrified to see Hong, Tam is stunned as Hong is staring at him. The police arrive and Tam tries to escape, however, he gets hit by a truck.

Phuong reconciles with her mother, Linh and Son are happy together. The movie ends with the scene in which Cu Hu is taking Phuong to sightsee on the boat. Phuong also discovers Cu Hu's unrequited love for her after a long time.

Cast
Nhã Phương as Linh
Thái Hòa as Cu Hù
Quý Bình as Tâm
Hoàng Bách as Sơn
Tú Vi as Phương
Kim Xuân as Mrs. Lê
Nancy Nguyễn as Hồng
Văn Tùng as Mr. Sáu Dũng
Mã Trung as Mr. Phong
Vy Minh as Nurse

Reception
The film grossed 91 billion đồng (US$4.3m) in Vietnam. It's the highest-grossing Vietnamese film in 2014.

References

External links

Quả tim máu at Facebook
Trailer

Vietnamese-language films
Vietnamese horror films
Vietnamese neo-noir films
2014 horror films
Films directed by Victor Vu
Films set in Vietnam
Films shot in Vietnam
Films based on works by Vietnamese writers
2014 films